K. K. Nishad (born 26 March 1978) is an Indian playback singer from Kozhikode, Kerala, India. He started his career in 2002 as a playback singer in the Malayalam movie Nakshathrakkannulla Rajakumaran Avanundoru Rajakumari.

Personal life

Nishad was born to T. N. Krishnankutty and Saradha M. V. in Kozhikode, on 26 April 1978. His father is a retired PWD engineer and mother in a housewife. His sister, Athira K. Krishnan is a singer and semi-finalist in the reality show "Star Singer" in Asianet.

Nishad took to singing at an early age. The school and college youth festivals conducted every year in Kerala provided golden opportunities to hone his skills. He was recognised for his music calibre in Mappilappattu and Kadhaprasangam. He is married to Savija and they have 2 sons, Adithya and Ayaan.

Academic 

He has completed his Master & B.Ed in Mathematics.

Performance

He has performed in major countries like USA, UK, Canada, South Africa, UAE, and Australia. He has shared stage with prominent singers like K S Chithra, SP Balasubrahmanyum, Sadhana Sargam, Sujatha Mohan, Vasundhara Das, Hariharan, Shanker Mahadevan, and P Jayachandran.

Career

Prior to becoming a musician, he was a Guest Lecturer at the Devagari St. Josephs College, Kozhikode. He is a post-graduate in Mathematics.

Nishad debuted as a playback singer in 2002 with the song "Manassukal Thammil [Puthooram] ..." in Rajasenan's Malayalam film Nakshathrakkannulla Rajakumaran Avanundoru Rajakumari under music director Benny Kannan. It was followed by Swapnam Kondu Thulabharam.

Genes

He was initiated into Carnatic music by his father.  Later on, he started learning Chelannoor Sukumaran Bhagavathar, Shivan and Sreedharan Mundangad. Presently, he in learning from Palai C. K. Ramachandran.

He also learned Hindustani music. He started learning from Sri Nalin Moolji and Fayaz Khan. Presently, he is learning from Suenani Dathateya Velankar. He was also trained under Mridangam players Sivan and Sumod.

Awards

2001 - Kairali Swaralaya Yesudas Award 
2007 - Bhadra Mini Screen Award
2008 - GMMA Award 
2009 - Vayalar Award
2013 - NP Abu Memorial Award

Discography

As Music Composer

Albums

As Playback Singer

Malayalam

Notes and references

1978 births
Living people
Musicians from Kozhikode
Malayalam playback singers
Indian male playback singers
Tamil playback singers
Malayali people
Singers from Kerala
Film musicians from Kerala
21st-century Indian singers
21st-century Indian male singers